The Jaffna Stallions (abbreviated as JS) is a franchise cricket team which competed in inaugural season of Lanka Premier League (LPL). For the 2020 season, the team was captained by Thisara Perera and coached by Thilina Kandamby. The team qualified for the semi-finals after winning 4 out of 8 matches. However, the team had the highest run rate of all teams. They qualified for the final by defeating Dambulla Viiking in the semi-final. The team won the final by defeating the Galle Gladiators.

Season summary
In the first game of their history, the Stallions faced the Galle Gladiators. The Gladiators never really got going aside from a quick-fire 58 runs off 23 balls by their captain Shahid Afridi. In response, the Stallions chased down the target of 175/8 made by the Gladiators with three balls to spare winning the match by 8 wickets. In Game 2, a captain's innings from Thisara Perera helped propel the Stallions to 217/8 from their 20 overs against Dambulla Viiking's. In the Viiking innings, Pakistani bowler Usman Shinwari took three wickets to give the Stallions their second win of the season.

Perera was involved once again in the Stallions' third game. He scored 68 runs off 28 balls to get the Stallions to 185/8. Usman Shinwari was once again the pick of the bowlers, this time with 3/17 to hand the Stallions their third successive win. In Game 4, the Stallions beat the Gladiators a second time. This win was largely due to the Stallions opener, Avishka Fernando who scored 84 runs off 59 balls and hit five 6's. This meant that the Stallions were still unbeaten in the tournament after playing four games.

Game 5 of the Stallions' season came against the Colombo Kings. Jaffna scored 148/9 from their 20 overs, with Wanindu Hasaranga top-scoring with 41 runs. In response, the target was chased down by the Colombo Kings with six wickets to spare. This was the Stallions' first loss of the season. Unfortunately for the Stallions, their sixth game was washed out. However, they stayed at the top of the table on the basis of a superior net run rate. Two days later, they played their penultimate game of the league stage against the Kandy Tuskers. They were bowled out for 150 runs, with Shoaib Malik top-scoring with 59 runs. They could not replicate the Tuskers with the ball, losing the game by 6 wickets.

The last match of the group stage for the Stallions was against the Kings. Batting first, the Kings scored 173/4 largely due to Laurie Evans, who scored the first-ever Lanka Premier League hundred. In response, the Stallions could only score 167/6 from their 20 overs, losing their third successive game. However, they still qualified for the semi-finals in third place.

In the semi-final, they defeated Dambulla Viiking with a margin of 37 runs.

The team opposed Galle Gladiators in the final. The Stallions won the toss and elected to bat. Pakistani skilled cricketer Shoaib Malik thumped 46 runs off 35 balls, Thisara Perera scored quick fire 39 runs off 14 balls and the team set the target of 189 runs. The Gladiators' performance in the match deteriorated, however, as skipper Dhananjaya Lakshan hammered 40 runs off 17 balls and Pakistani cricketer Azam Khan scored 36 runs off 17 balls. The tournament ceased with the Stallions winning their first inaugural Lanka Premier League season after recording a comprehensive 53-run win over the Gladiators.

Squad

Administration and support staff

Season standings

League table

Matches

Statistics

Most runs

Most wickets

Awards and achievements

References

2020 Lanka Premier League